This is an incomplete list of crime bosses. This list is arranged alphabetically by last name, and broken into categories by year that an individual is believed to have assumed leadership of a criminal organization

19th century 
Shimizu Jirocho (1820-1893), natural causes
James Dolan (1848–1898), natural causes
Johnny Dolan (1849–1876), executed
Monk Eastman (1875–1920), assassinated
Paul Kelly (1876–1936), natural causes
Vito Cascio Ferro (1862–1943)
Giosue Gallucci (1864–1915), assassinated
Huang Jinrong (1868–1953), natural causes
John Morrissey (1831-1878), natural causes
Jefferson R. "Soapy" Smith (1860–1898), assassinated
Al Swearengen (1845–1904), natural causes

Early 20th century (1900–1919) 
James "Big Jim" Colosimo (1878–1920), assassinated
Salvatore "Toto" D'Aquila (1878–1928), assassinated
Sebastiano DiGaetano (1862–?), disappeared in 1912
Vito Di Giorgio (1880–1922), assassinated
Du Yuesheng (1888–1951), natural causes
Ignazio "the Wolf" Lupo (1877–1947), natural causes
Owney "The Killer" Madden (1891–1965), natural causes
Giuseppe Morello, (1867–1930), assassinated
Nicholas Morello (1890–1916), assassinated
Salvatore Sabella (1891–1962), natural causes
Nicolo Schiro (1872–1957), natural causes
Ciro Terranova (1889–1938), natural causes
Calogero Vizzini (1877–1954), natural causes
Harukichi Yamaguchi (1881–1938), natural causes

Prohibition (1919–1933) 
Joe Adonis (1902–1971), natural causes
Joe Aiello (1891–1930), assassinated
Joseph Ardizzone (1884–1932), assassinated
Joseph "Joe Bananas" Bonanno (1905–2002), natural causes
Al "Scarface" Capone (1899–1947), natural causes
Vincent "Mad Dog" Coll (1908–1932), assassinated
Moe Dalitz (1899–1989), natural causes
Rosario DeSimone (1873–1946), natural causes
Jack "Legs" Diamond (1897–1931), assassinated
Jack Dragna (1891–1956), natural causes
Vincent "The Schemer" Drucci (1898–1927), assassinated
Tommy Gagliano (1884–1951), natural causes
Waxey Gordon (1886–1952), natural causes in prison
Enoch L. Johnson  (1883–1968), natural causes
Meyer Lansky (1902–1983), natural causes
John Lazia (1896–1934), assassinated
Louis Lepke (1897–1944), executed
Antonio "The Scourge" Lombardo (1892–1928), assassinated
Charles "Lucky" Luciano (1897–1962), natural causes
Stefano "The Undertaker" Magaddino (1891–1974), natural causes
Vincent Mangano (1888–1951), assassinated
Salvatore Maranzano (1886–1931), assassinated
Giuseppe "Joe the Boss" Masseria (1887–1931), assassinated
Gaspare Messina (1879–1957), natural causes
George "Bugs" Moran (1891–1957), natural causes
Alfred Mineo (1880–1930), assassinated
Johnny Jack Nounes (1890-1970)
Dean O'Banion (1892–1924), assassinated
Raymond L.S. Patriarca (1908–1984), natural causes
Joseph Pinzolo (1887–1930), assassinated
Joe Profaci (1897–1962), natural causes
Ollie Quinn
Gaetano Reina (1889–1930), assassinated
George Remus (1874–1952), natural causes
Paul "The Waiter" Ricca (1897–1972), natural causes
Arnold Rothstein (1882–1928), assassinated
Joseph "Polack Joe" Saltis (1894–1947), natural causes
Dutch Schultz (1902–1935), assassinated
Benjamin "Bugsy" Siegel (1906–1947), assassinated
Stephanie "Queenie" St. Clair (1886–1969), natural causes
Johnny Torrio (1882–1957), natural causes
Dutch Voight (1888–1986), natural causes
Earl "Hymie" Weiss (1898–1926), assassinated
Frankie Yale (1893–1928), assassinated
Frankie LaPorte
Noboru Yamaguchi (1902–1942), natural causes
Abner "Longy" Zwillman (1899–1959), suicide

Great Depression and World War II (1933–1945) 
Joseph "Joe the Barber" Barbara (1905–1959), natural causes
Charles Binaggio (1909–1950), assassinated
Alex "Shondor" Birns (1907–1975), assassinated
Charles "Charlie the Wop" Carrollo (1902–1979), natural causes
Frank Costello (1891–1973), natural causes
Antonio Cottone (1904–1956), assassinated
Salvatore Giuliano (1922–1950), killed by law enforcement.
Ellsworth "Bumpy" Johnson (1905–1968), natural causes
Yoshio Kodama (1911–1984), natural causes
Sam "The Velvet Glove" Maceo (1894-1951), natural causes
Rosario "Papa Rose" Maceo (1887-1954), natural causes
Willie Moretti (1894–1951), assassinated
Alfred "Big Al" Polizzi (1900–1975), natural causes
Ross Prio (1901–1972), natural causes
Giuseppe Genco Russo (1893–1976), natural causes
Ryōichi Sasakawa (1899–1995), natural causes
John T. Scalish (1912–1976), natural causes
John Sciandra (1899–1940), natural causes
Santo Trafficante Sr. (1886–1954), natural causes

Post-World War II (1945–1970) 
Tony "Big Tuna" Accardo (1906–1992), natural causes
Felix "Milwaukee Phil" Alderisio (1912–1971), natural causes in prison
Gus Alex (1916–1998), natural causes in prison
Albert Anastasia (1902–1957), assassinated
Gaetano Badalamenti (1923–2004), natural causes in prison
"King" David Barksdale (1947–1974), natural causes
Francesco Paolo Bontade (1914–1974), natural causes
Angelo Bruno (1910–1980), assassinated
Russell Bufalino (1903–1994), natural causes
Giuseppe Calderone (1925–1978), assassinated
Giuseppe Calò (born 1931), serving life sentence in prison
Michele "The Cobra" Cavataio (1929–1969), assassinated
Đại Cathay (1940-1967), cause of death disputed
Jackie "The Lackey" Cerone (1914–1996), natural causes
Chen "King Duck" Chi-li (1943–2007), natural causes
Carl Civella (1910–1994), natural causes in prison
Nicholas Civella (1912–1983), natural causes
Joseph Civello (1902–1970), natural causes
Mickey Cohen (1913–1976), natural causes
Joe Colombo (1914–1978), natural causes
Vincenzo Cotroni (1911–1984), natural causes
Simone "Sam the Plumber" DeCavalcante (1912–1997), natural causes
Frank DeSimone (1909–1967), natural causes
Calcedonio Di Pisa (1931–1962), assassinated
Gaspar DiGregorio (1905–1970), natural causes
Thomas "Tommy Ryan" Eboli (1911–1972), assassinated
Gaetano Fidanzati (1935–2013), natural causes in prison
Jeff Fort (born 1947), serving life sentence in prison
Marcel Francisci (1920–1982), assassinated
"Crazy" Joe Gallo (1929–1972), assassinated
Carlo Gambino (1902–1976), natural causes
Sam "Momo" Giancana (1908–1975), assassinated
Vito Genovese (1897–1969), natural causes in prison
Antonio "Nenè" Geraci (1917–2007), natural causes
Anthony "Fat Tony" Gizzo (1902–1953), natural causes
Michele "The Pope" Greco (1924–2008), natural causes in prison
Salvatore "The Engineer" Greco (born 1924), international fugitive since 1963.
Salvatore "Little Bird" Greco (1923–1978), natural causes
Danny Greene (1933–1977), assassinated
Kakuji Inagawa (1914–2007), natural causes
Dündar Kılıç (1935–1999), natural causes
Ronnie and Reggie Kray (1933-1995 and 2000), natural causes
Angelo La Barbera (1924–1975), assassinated
Salvatore La Barbera (1922–1963), assassinated
Luciano Leggio (1925–1993), natural causes in prison
Nick Licata (1897–1974), natural causes
Philip "Cockeyed Phil" Lombardo (1908–1987), natural causes
Frank Lucas, retired from crime since 1991.
Tommy Lucchese (1899–1967), natural causes
Hisayuki Machii (1923–2002), natural causes
Joseph Magliocco (1898–1963), natural causes
Stefano Magaddino (1891–1974), natural causes
Cesare Manzella (1897–1963), assassinated
Carlos Marcello (1910–1993), natural causes
Eddie McGrath (born 1906, date of death unknown), cause of death unknown
James "Buddy" McLean (1929–1965), assassinated
Joe "Pegleg" Morgan (1929–1993), natural causes in prison
Michele Navarra (1905–1958), assassinated
John "Handsome Johnny" Roselli (1905–1976), assassinated
Khun Sa (1933–2007), natural causes
Antonio Salamone (1918–1998), natural causes
Paul Sciacca (died 1970), natural causes
Mickey Spillane (1934–1977), assassinated
Tokutaro Takayama (1928–2003), natural causes
Masaru Takumi (1936–1997), assassinated
Kazuo Taoka (1913–1981), natural causes
Santo Trafficante, Jr. (1914–1987), natural causes
Carmine "Mr. Gribbs" Tramunti (1910–1978), natural causes in prison
Aslan "Grandpa Hassan" Usoyan (1937–2013), assassinated
Howie Winter (1929–2020), retired as boss in 1978.
Kenichi Yamamoto (1925–1982), natural causes

Late 20th century (1970–2000) 
Pablo Acosta Villarreal (1937–1987), killed by law enforcement
Mariano Agate (born 1939–2013), natural causes
Pietro "The Little Gentleman" Aglieri (born 1959), serving life sentence in prison
Evsei Agron (died 1985), assassinated
Rafael Aguilar Guajardo (1950–1993), assassinated
Joseph "Joey Doves" Aiuppa (1907–1997), natural causes
Yaakov Alperon (1955–2008), assassinated
Victor "Little Vic" Amuso (born 1934), serving life sentence in prison
Braulio Arellano Domínguez (d. 2009), killed by law enforcement
Francisco Javier Arellano Félix (born 1969), serving twenty-three-year prison sentence
Leoluca Bagarella (born 1942), serving life sentence in prison
Marat Balagula (born 1943), at large
Leroy "Nicky" Barnes (1933–2012), disease
Jose Miguel Battle, Sr. (1930–2007), natural causes in prison
Donovan "Bulbie" Bennett (1964–2005), killed by law enforcement
Vivian Blake (1956–2010), natural causes
Griselda Blanco (1943–2012), assassinated
Stefano Bontade (1939–1981), assassinated
Dominic Brooklier (1914–1984), natural causes in prison
Klaus Bruinsma (1953–1991), assassinated
Angelo Bruno (1910–1980), assassinated
Giovanni "The Pig" Brusca (born 1957), serving life sentence in prison
James "Whitey" Bulger (1929–2018), murdered in prison
Martin "The General" Cahill (1949–1994), assassinated
Năm Cam (1947–2004), executed
William "Willie the Rat" Cammisano (1914–1995), natural causes
Osiel Cárdenas Guillén (born 1967), serving twenty-five-year sentence
Samuel "Sam Wings" Carlisi (1914–1997), natural causes in prison
Amado Carrillo Fuentes (1956–1997), natural causes
Vicente Carrillo Fuentes (born 1962), imprisoned
Alfonso Caruana (born 1946), serving twenty-two-year prison sentence
Anthony "Gaspipe" Casso (born 1942), serving life sentence in prison
Paul Castellano (1915–1985), assassinated
Peter Chong (born 1943), at large
Renato Cinquegranella (born 1949), international fugitive since 2018
Anthony "Tony Ripe" Civella (1930–1976), natural causes
Christopher "Dudus" Coke (born 1969), serving twenty-three-year prison sentence
Jimmy Coonan (born 1946), serving seventy-five-year prison sentence
Anthony "Tony Ducks" Corallo (1913–2000), natural causes in prison
John D'Amato (died 1992), assassinated
William "Big Billy" D'Elia (born 1946), retired
Boris Dekanidze (died 1995), executed.
Giuseppe "The Tiger" Di Cristina (1923–1978), assassinated
Thomas DiBella (1905-1988), natural causes
John "No Nose" DiFronzo (1928–2018), natural causes
Paolo Di Lauro (born 1953), imprisoned
Dương Văn Khánh (1956-1998), executed
Rayful Edmond (born 1964), currently enrolled in the Witness Protection Program
Pablo Escobar (1949–1993), killed by law enforcement.
Natale "Joe Diamond" Evola (1907–1973), natural causes
Giuseppe Falsone (born 1970), serving life sentence in prison
Giuseppe Farinella (1925–2017), natural causes in prison
Miguel Ángel Félix Gallardo (born 1946), serving life sentence in prison
Joseph Ferriola (1927–1989), natural causes
Guy Fisher (born 1947), serving life sentence in prison
Aladino "Jimmy the Weasel" Fratianno (1913–1993), natural causes
Carmine "The Cigar" Galante (1910–1979), assassinated
Juan García Ábrego (born 1944), serving life sentence in prison
Giuseppe Giacomo Gambino (1941–1996), suicide
Raffaele Ganci (born 1932), serving life sentence in prison
Mario Gigante (born 1923), at large
Vincent "The Chin" Gigante (1928–2005), natural causes in prison
"Factory" John Gilligan (born 1952), on trial
Tadamasa Goto (born 1943), retired
John Gotti (1940–2002), natural causes in prison
Giuseppe Graviano (born 1963), serving life sentence in prison
Joaquín "El Chapo" Guzmán (born 1957), serving life sentence in prison
Dung Hà (1965-2000), assassinated
Larry Hoover (born 1950), serving life sentence in prison
Dawood Ibrahim (born 1955), international fugitive since 1993
Georgi Iliev (1966–2005), assassinated
Vasil Iliev (1964–1995), assassinated
Salvatore Inzerillo (1944–1981), assassinated
Tadashi Irie (born 1944), at large
Vyacheslav "Yaponchik" Ivankov (1940–2009), assassinated
Pappu Kalani (born 1951), serving life sentence in prison
Zakhariy Kalashov (born 1953), at large
Vladimir Kumarin (born 1956), serving fourteen-year prison sentence
Otari Kvantrishvili (1948–1994), assassinated
Carlos Lehder (born 1950), serving fifty-five-year prison sentence
James T. "Blackie" Licavoli (1904–1985), natural causes in prison
Salvatore "The Baron" Lo Piccolo (born 1942), serving life sentence in prison
Joseph "Joey the Clown" Lombardo, (born 1929), serving life sentence in prison
Salvatore Lo Russo (born 1953), arrested and became a pentito
Giuseppe Lucchese (born 1959), serving life sentence in prison
Francesco Madonia (1924–2007), natural causes in prison
Francesco Mallardo (born 1951), imprisoned
Andrea Manciaracina (born 1962), serving life sentence in prison
Luigi "Baby Shacks" Manocchio (born 1929), at large
Howard Marks (1945–2016), natural causes
Joseph "Big Joey" Massino (born 1943), first boss of one of the Five Families in New York City to turn state's evidence
Francesco Matrone (born 1947), serving two life sentences in prison
Kenneth "Supreme" McGriff (born 1960), serving life sentence in prison
Joseph "Skinny Joey" Merlino (born 1962), serving two-year prison sentence
Gerlandino Messina (born 1972), serving nine-year prison sentence
Matteo Messina Denaro (born 1962), international fugitive since 1993
Sergei Mikhailov (born 1958), at large
Peter "Shakes" Milano (1925–2012), natural causes
Felix "The Cat" Mitchell (1954–1986), assassinated
Semion Mogilevich (born 1946), international fugitive since 2003
Diego León Montoya Sánchez (born 1958), serving forty-five-year prison sentence
Rocco Morabito (born 1966),  international fugitive since 2019
Giovanni Motisi (born 1959), international fugitive since 1998
Boris Nayfeld (born c.1947), retired
Khozh-Ahmed Noukhayev (born 1954), missing and presumed dead
Tariel Oniani (born 1952), serving ten-year prison sentence
Héctor Luis Palma Salazar (born 1940), awaiting trial
Johnny Papalia (1924–1997), assassinated
Raymond Patriarca Jr. (born 1945), retired
Carmine "Junior" Persico (1933–2019), natural causes in prison
Santiago Luis Polanco Rodríguez (born 1961), retired
Mario Prestifilippo (1958–1987), assassinated
Bernardo "Bennie the Tractor" Provenzano (1933–2016), natural causes in prison
Giuseppe "o Giappone" Puca (1955-1989), assassinated
Vincenzo Puccio (1945–1989), assassinated
Domenico Raccuglia (born 1964), serving life sentence in prison
Bosko "The Yugo" Radonjich (born 1943-2011), natural causes
Philip "Rusty" Rastelli (1918–1991), natural causes
Željko "Arkan" Ražnatović (1952–2000), assassinated
Rosario Riccobono (1929–1982), assassinated
Salvatore "Totò" Riina (1930-2017), natural causes in prison
Nicolo Rizzuto (1924–2010), assassinated
Vito Rizzuto (1946–2013), natural causes
José Gonzalo Rodríguez Gacha (1947–1989), killed by law enforcement
Gilberto Rodríguez Orejuela (born 1939), serving thirty-year prison sentence
Miguel Rodríguez Orejuela (born 1943), serving thirty-year prison sentence
Pasquale Russo (born 1947), serving life sentence in prison
Salvatore Russo (born 1958), serving life sentence in prison
"Cadillac" Frank Salemme (born 1933), serving life sentence in prison
Anthony "Fat Tony" Salerno (1911–1992), natural causes in prison
José Santacruz Londoño (1943–1996), killed by law enforcement
Benedetto "The Hunter" Santapaola (born 1938), serving life sentence in prison
Nicodemo "Little Nicky" Scarfo (1929–2017), natural causes in prison
Benedetto Spera (born 1934), serving life sentence in prison
Anthony "Tony the Ant" Spilotro (1938–1986), assassinated
John Stanfa (born 1940), serving life sentence in prison
Nikolay Suleimanov (1955–1994), assassinated
Omid Tahvili (born 1970), international fugitive since 2007
Masahisa Takenaka (1933–1985), assassinated
Philip "Chicken Man" Testa (1924–1981), assassinated
David Thai (born 1956), serving life sentence in prison
Frank "Funzi" Tieri (1904–1981), natural causes
Joseph "Lead Pipe Joe" Todaro (1923–2012), natural causes
Alimzhan Tokhtakhunov (born 1949), international fugitive since 2002
Robert Trimbole (1931–1987), natural causes
John "Peanuts" Tronolone (1910–1991), natural causes
Mery Valencia (born 1953), at large
Koose Muniswamy Veerappan (1952–2004), killed by law enforcement
Vincenzo Virga (born 1936), serving life sentence in prison
Giuseppa "Giusy" Vitale (born 1972), currently enrolled in the Italian Witness Protection Program
Vito Vitale (born 1958), at large
Yoshinori Watanabe (1941–2012), natural causes

Early 21st century (2000–)

Raffaele Amato (born 1965), imprisoned 
Vincent "Vinny Gorgeous" Basciano (born 1959), serving life sentence in prison
Liborio "Barney" Bellomo (born 1957)
Frank Cali (1965–2019), assassinated
Domenico Cefalù (born 1947)
Cosimo Di Lauro (1973–2022), natural causes
Marco Di Lauro (born 1980), serving life sentence in prison
Francesco Domingo (born 1956), currently awaiting sentencing
Servando "The Teacher" Gómez Martínez (born 1966), imprisoned
Peter "One-Eyed Pete" Gotti (1939–2021) natural causes while in prison
Mohamed Abdi "Big Mouth" Hassan, serving twenty-year prison sentence
Rovshan Janiyev (1975–2016), assassinated
Paul Le Roux (born 1972), currently awaiting sentencing
Joseph "Uncle Joe" Ligambi (born 1939), retired
Michael "The Nose" Mancuso (born 1955)
James "Little Jimmy" Marcello (born 1943), serving life sentence in prison
Settimo Mineo (born 1938), imprisoned
Nazario "The Rosary" Moreno González (1970–2014), killed by law enforcement
Gianni Nicchi (born 1981), serving eighteen-year prison sentence
Cesare Pagano (born 1969), imprisoned
Antonio Rotolo (born 1946), serving thirteen-year prison sentence
Kenichi Shinoda (born 1942), at large
Kiyoshi Takayama (born 1947), serving six-year prison sentence
Ross Ulbricht (born 1984), serving life sentence in prison

See also 

 List of criminal enterprises, gangs and syndicates
 List of Italian-American mobsters
 List of fictional crime bosses

References 

 
Mob Life: Gangster Kings of Crime — slideshow by Life magazine

Lists of criminals

Organized crime
Organized crime-related lists